Lacaille 9352 c or GJ 887 c is an exoplanet announced in 2020 and located 10.74 light years away, in the constellation of Piscis Austrinus.

It was detected using the radial velocity method from observations with HARPS in Chile and HIRES in Hawaii.



Characteristics 

The planet orbits the red dwarf star Lacaille 9352, which has an age of 4.57 billion years.

Lacaille 9352 c is considered a Super-Earth with a minimum mass of 7.6 Earth masses.

Habitability 

With an orbital period of 21.8 days, the exoplanet is located at 0.12 AU from the star, which is close to the inner edge of the habitable zone (but still outside).

Lacaille 9352 c could be considered potentially habitable within the optimistic sample (between 5 and 10 earth masses).

References 

Exoplanets discovered in 2019
Exoplanets detected by radial velocity
Super-Earths